The following list of Georgian cities is divided into three lists for Georgia itself, and the disputed territories of Abkhazia and South Ossetia. Although not recognized by most countries, Abkhazia and South Ossetia have been partially de facto independent since, respectively, 1992 and 1991 and occupied by Russia since 2008 Russo-Georgian War.

Cities and towns in Georgia

This is a list of the cities and towns (Georgian: ქალაქი, k'alak'i) in Georgia, according to the 2014 census data of the Department of Statistics of Georgia. The list does not include the smaller urban-type settlements categorized in Georgia as daba (დაბა). The list also does not include cities and towns in the disputed territories of Abkhazia and South Ossetia.

Cities and towns in Abkhazia

This is a list of the largest cities and towns in Abkhazia. Data for 1989 is official data from the Soviet Census 1989, data for 2010 are unofficial estimates of the World Gazetteer.

Cities and towns in Samachablo 

This is a list of the largest cities and towns in Samachablo. Data for 1989 is official data from the Soviet Census 1989, data for 2010 are unofficial estimates of the World Gazetteer.

Future cities and towns
The intent to construct Lazica, a new city on Georgia's Black Sea littoral, was unveiled by President of Georgia Mikheil Saakashvili on December 4, 2011. The construction was scheduled to be launched in 2012.

See also 
 Administrative divisions of Georgia

References

Notes

 
Georgia, List of cities in
Georgia
Cities